TSC Maryland Red Devils is an American soccer team based in Lisbon, Maryland, United States. Founded in 2009, the team plays in the National Premier Soccer League (NPSL), a national amateur league at the fourth tier of the American Soccer Pyramid, in the Northeast Keystone Division.

The team splits its home games between the stadium at Howard Community College and Cedar Lane Park, both in nearby Columbia, Maryland. The team's colors are red, black and white.

The team organization is owned and operated by the Thunder Soccer Club, a long-standing youth soccer organization representing the Howard County area of Maryland.

History

Players

2010 roster
Source:

Year-by-year

Head coaches
  Stefan Draganov (2010–present)

Stadia
 Stadium at Howard Community College; Columbia, Maryland (2010–present)
 Cedar Lane Park; Columbia, Maryland (2010–present)

References

External links
 Official Site
 NPSL Official Site

Association football clubs established in 2009
National Premier Soccer League teams
Soccer clubs in Maryland
2009 establishments in Maryland
Association football clubs disestablished in 2010
2010 disestablishments in Maryland
Columbia, Maryland